Approach may refer to:

Aviation
Visual approach
Instrument approach
Final approach

Music
 Approach (album), by Von Hertzen Brothers
 The Approach, an album by I:Scintilla

Other uses
Approach Beach, a gazetted beach in Ting Kau, Hong Kong
Approach shot (disambiguation)
Lotus Approach, a database
Bridge approach
Approaches to scientific method
Bowling action in the sport of cricket
Flirting

See also 
Capability approach, in economic theory
Final approach (disambiguation)